In the South-West Indian Ocean, Météo-France's La Réunion tropical cyclone centre (MFR, RSMC La Réunion) monitors all tropical cyclones. A very intense tropical cyclone (VITC) is the highest category on the South-West Indian Ocean Tropical Cyclone scale, and has winds of over 115 knots (212 kilometres per hour, 132 miles per hour).
The most recent very intense tropical cyclone was Cyclone Freddy in 2023.

Background
The South-West Indian Ocean tropical cyclone basin is located to the south of the Equator between Africa and 90°E. The basin is officially monitored by Météo-France who run the Regional Specialised  Meteorological Centre in La Réunion, while other meteorological services such as the Australian Bureau of Meteorology, Mauritius Meteorological Service as well as the United States Joint Typhoon Warning Center also monitor the basin.

Systems

|-
|Lydie
|March 6–8, 1973
|
|
|Réunion || $2 million ||  ||
|-
| Gervaise ||  ||  ||  || Mauritus, Reunion || || ||
|-
| Clotilde ||  ||  ||  || None ||  ||  ||
|-
| Terry–Danae ||   ||  ||  || None ||  ||  ||
|-
|Florine
|January 7, 1981
|
|
|Réunion
|
|
|
|-
| Chris-Damia || ||  ||  || || ||
|-
|  ||  ||  ||  || Madagascar, Mozambique ||  ||  || 
|-
|  ||  ||  ||  || Madagascar, Réunion ||  ||  || 
|-
|  ||  ||  ||  || Seychelles, Madagascar, Mayotte ||  ||  ||
|-
|  ||  ||  ||  || Rodrigues ||  ||  || 
|-
|  ||  ||  ||  || None ||  ||  ||
|-
|  ||  ||  ||  || None ||  ||  ||
|-
|  ||  ||  ||  || Comoros, Mozambique, Madagascar || ≥ ||  ||
|-
|  ||  ||   ||  || Rodrigues ||  ||  || 
|-
| Eunice ||  ||  ||  || None ||  ||  ||
|-
| Fantala ||  ||  ||  || Seychelles, Tanzania ||  ||  || 
|-
| Ambali ||  ||  ||  || None ||  ||  ||
|-
| Faraji ||  ||  ||  || None ||  ||  ||
|-
| Darian ||  ||  ||  || None ||  ||  ||
|-
| Freddy ||  ||  ||  || Mauritius, Réunion, Mascarene Islands, Madagascar, Mozambique, Zimbabwe, Malawi || Unknown ||    ||
 |}

Other systems
The Mauritius Meteorological Service classifies Dina in 2002 as a Very Intense Tropical Cyclone.

Climatology

See also

List of Category 5 Atlantic hurricanes
List of Category 5 Pacific hurricanes

Notes

References

Very intense tropical cyclones
South-West Indian Ocean